Sethubhavachatram block is a revenue block in the Peravurani taluk of Thanjavur district, Tamil Nadu, India. There are a total of 37 villages in the block. The block development office is located at Peravurani

List of Panchayat Villages

References 

 

Revenue blocks of Thanjavur district